Grey Lynn is a former New Zealand parliamentary electorate, in the city of Auckland. It existed from 1902 to 1978, and was represented by nine Members of Parliament.

Population centres
The Representation Act 1900 had increased the membership of the House of Representatives from general electorates 70 to 76, and this was implemented through the 1902 electoral redistribution. In 1902, changes to the country quota affected the three-member electorates in the four main centres. The tolerance between electorates was increased to ±1,250 so that the Representation Commissions (since 1896, there had been separate commissions for the North and South Islands) could take greater account of communities of interest. These changes proved very disruptive to existing boundaries, and six electorates were established for the first time, including Grey Lynn, and two electorates that previously existed were re-established.

During this electorate's existence, it was centred on the suburb of Grey Lynn. In the 1907 electoral redistribution, the electorate was classed as fully urban, and the country quota thus no longer applied.

History
The electorate existed from 1902 to 1978. George Fowlds of the Liberal Party was the electorate's first representative.

In 1919 Ellen Melville was one of three women who stood at short notice when women were able to stand as candidates for election to parliament. She stood on behalf of the Reform Party and came second in Grey Lynn.

During 1930, Fletcher became an Independent. Four candidates stood in total, with Lee defeating the incumbent.

Members of Parliament
The electorate was represented by nine Members of Parliament.

Key

Table footnotes:

Election results

1975 election

1972 election

1969 election

1966 election

1963 election

1963 by-election

1960 election

1957 election

1954 election

1951 election

1949 election

1946 election

1943 election

1938 election

1935 election

1931 election

1928 election

1925 election

1922 election

1919 election

1914 election

1911 election

 
 
 
 
 
|-
|style="background-color:#E9E9E9" ! colspan="6" style="text-align:left;" |'''Second ballot result
|-

1908 election

1905 election

1902 election

Notes

References

Historical electorates of New Zealand
Politics of the Auckland Region
1902 establishments in New Zealand
1978 disestablishments in New Zealand